The National Youth Orchestra of Great Britain (NYO-GB) is the national youth orchestra of the United Kingdom, consisting of 164 members of ages 13 to 19 years. Their mission is to "give thrilling experiences of orchestral music to teenage musicians and audiences who need them most." Auditions take place in the autumn each year at various locations in the country. The minimum standard needed to audition is ABRSM / Trinity Guildhall / London College of Music Grade 8 Distinction, though it is not necessary to have taken any examinations. In 2011, the orchestra was shortlisted for the Royal Philharmonic Society's Best Ensemble Award. In 2012, the NYO received the Queen's Medal for Music. In 2015 the NYO received the Royal Philharmonic Society's Ensemble award, which recognized particularly the launch of NYO Inspire as well as their other work.

NYO organization and past conductors
Ruth Railton (later Dame Ruth King) founded the National Youth Orchestra in 1948. Subsequent NYO directors have included Ivey Dickson (1966–1984), Derek Bourgeois (1984–1993), Jill White (1993–2002), and Jonathan Vaughan (2002–2007). Sarah Alexander was named the NYO's director in 2007 and is now titled Chief Executive & Artistic Director.

Each course is directed by a distinguished conductor.  These have included Vladimir Jurowski, Marin Alsop, Jiří Bělohlávek, Pierre Boulez, Sir Adrian Boult, Sir Malcolm Sargent, Semyon Bychkov, Paul Daniel, Sir Andrew Davis, Sir Colin Davis, Sir Mark Elder, Iván Fischer, Edward Gardner, Antonio Pappano, Hugo Rignold, Andrew Litton, Keith Lockhart, Sir Roger Norrington, Tadaaki Otaka, Geoffrey Paterson, Sir Simon Rattle and Mstislav Rostropovich. Walter Susskind was a founder conductor of the NYO and was the main conductor on several courses, well into the 1950s. Later in the NYO's history, Christopher Seaman was the main conductor on a number of courses.

Courses
The orchestra assembles thrice-yearly during school holidays, at New Year, Easter and Summer for two-week residential courses, coached by tutors. Their repertoire includes a wide variety of works by Romantic, 20th century and contemporary composers including James MacMillan, Thomas Adès, and most recently Julian Anderson, Judith Weir and Gabriel Prokofiev. In addition to the main orchestral activity they have time to participate in a range of activities including chamber music, physical workshops, dance, singing, improvisation and establish friendships.

Venues for their concerts include Barbican Hall, (London), Symphony Hall, Birmingham, Bridgewater Hall, (Manchester), The Sage Gateshead, Philharmonic Hall, Liverpool and Royal Festival Hall, London. Every year they play in a Promenade Concert in the Royal Albert Hall to celebrate young British talent. Performances in 2011, for example, included Gabriel Prokofiev's Concerto for Turntables & Orchestra with DJ Switch, Britten's Piano Concerto and Sergei Prokofiev's Romeo & Juliet televised at the BBC Proms, Leoš Janáček's Sinfonietta (which required an enlarged brass section) under Kristjan Järvi and Gustav Mahler's epic final masterpiece, Symphony No. 10, completed by Deryck Cooke, as part of the Southbank Centre's Mahler centenary celebrations.

Contemporary music is also an important part of their repertoire. In August 2010 as part of their performance at the BBC Proms (marking the conclusion of their summer course) the orchestra gave the London premiere of British composer Julian Anderson's latest orchestral showpiece, Fantasias, under Semyon Bychkov, which had been commissioned specially for the highly virtuosic Cleveland Orchestra who gave the world premiere in November 2009. The NYO also gave the European premiere of the same work at Birmingham Symphony Hall.

In April 2010 the orchestra expanded to a huge 173 players to focus on the entire orchestral works of Edgard Varèse, including the first UK performance of Varèse's most famous piece in its original version from 1921, Amériques, under Paul Daniel. Their concert at Royal Festival Hall was the climax of the Varèse 360° event, in which the NYO and London Sinfonietta (under David Atherton) performed the entire works of Varèse over one weekend as part of the Southbank Centre's annual Ether festival. Courses also feature encounters between NYO members and younger musicians so they can pass on their passion and expertise to the next generation.

The orchestra made its debut at Young Euro Classic in 2015, returning in 2019.

NYO Composers
NYO members have always had the opportunity to benefit from specialised training in composition and to have their works performed on NYO courses, usually on an informal basis. A composers' course (consisting of 7 young composers), from 2010 directed by composers Anna Meredith and Larry Goves, now runs in tandem with the orchestra during the residential courses, writing pieces for a small group of instrumentalists and running short workshops with the entire symphony orchestra. In more recent years the composers' pieces have been more formally performed as a pre- or post-concert event to the NYO's main concerts.

NYO Inspire
NYO started holding open days in 1998 as a means of enabling young musicians to experience the fun of working with other musicians of the same age under the guidance of NYO's renowned tutors. Recently, these became Inspire Days or Residencies where the NYO's current members spend the time with younger, or less experienced players, sharing their insights and inspiration. These take place at the start of the NYO's Spring and Summer courses and at other times during the year.

See also 
Other national level ensembles from different organizations:

National Youth Wind Orchestra of Great Britain
National Youth Concert Band of Great Britain
National Youth String Orchestra
National Children's Orchestra of Great Britain
National Youth Jazz Orchestra
National Youth Wind Ensemble of Great Britain
National Children's Wind Orchestra of Great Britain
National Children's Wind Sinfonia of Great Britain
National Youth Orchestra of Scotland
National Youth Orchestra of Wales

Other international national youth orchestras:
 List of youth orchestras

References

Sources
 Official brochure of the National Youth Orchestra, Summer 2007

British symphony orchestras
British youth orchestras
Holborn
1948 establishments in the United Kingdom
Musical groups established in 1948
Great Britain
Organisations based in the London Borough of Camden